Cymothoe capella, the golden glider, is a butterfly in the family Nymphalidae. It is found in Nigeria (the Cross River loop and the eastern part of the country), Cameroon, Equatorial Guinea, Gabon, the Republic of the Congo, the Central African Republic and the Democratic Republic of the Congo (Tshopo and Sankuru). The habitat consists of primary forests.

References

Butterflies described in 1871
Cymothoe (butterfly)
Butterflies of Africa
Taxa named by Christopher Ward (entomologist)